11β-Methoxyestradiol (11β-MeOE2; developmental code name RU-2504) is a synthetic steroidal estrogen which was never marketed. It has about 86% of the relative binding affinity of estradiol for the estrogen receptor. 11β-MeOE2 is structurally related to moxestrol (11β-methoxy-17α-ethynylestradiol). 11β-MeOE2 and moxestrol are substantially more potent than their non-methoxylated analogues (estradiol and ethinylestradiol, respectively) in mice.

See also
 Moxestrol
 11β-Chloromethylestradiol

References

Abandoned drugs
Secondary alcohols
Estranes
Estrogen ethers
Synthetic estrogens